Jan was a Hungarian nobleman and military general in the second half of the 11th century. He played a decisive role in the royal campaign against the Byzantine Empire in 1071.

Biography
Jan (also Ian or John) elevated into the position of ispán of Sopron County by 1071, during the reign of Solomon, King of Hungary. His dignity is the earliest evidence of the existence of the county since at least the second half of the 11th century.

Pecheneg troops pillaged Syrmia (now in Serbia) in 1071. As King Solomon and his cousin, Duke Géza suspected that the soldiers of the Byzantine garrison at Belgrade incited the marauders against Hungary, they decided to attack the fortress. The Hungarian army crossed the river Sava and laid siege to Belgrade. Upon the request of the Byzantine commander, Niketas, the Pechenegs sent a relief army, but they were defeated and annihilated by Jan and his troops from Sopron County on their route to Belgrade. Thereafter, the Hungarians took Belgrade after a siege of three months. Following the campaign, Solomon and Géza have gifted and rewarded Jan generously.

Historian Péter Kovács considers the author of the 14th-century Illuminated Chronicle used biblical, antique and medieval literary tropes of the metaphor "tamquam lapis limpidissimus vasa fictilia contrivisset", when described Jan's heroism. Earlier assumptions (for instance, literary historian János Horváth, Jr.) sought that metaphor in the folk tradition. The motif set and lexical-phraseology of Jan's role in the war is based on the biblical story (Books of Samuel) of David and Goliath.

References

Sources

Primary sources

 The Hungarian Illuminated Chronicle: Chronica de Gestis Hungarorum (Edited by Dezső Dercsényi) (1970). Corvina, Taplinger Publishing. .

Secondary studies

 
 

11th-century Hungarian people
Medieval Hungarian military leaders